Otto Kirchner (July 13, 1846July 21, 1920) was a Michigan politician.

Early life
Kirchner was born on July 13, 1846 in Germany. His father was Rudolph Kirchner. Kirchner emigrated from Germany to the United States in 1853.

Career
In the United States, Kirchner studied law, was admitted to the Michigan Bar, and started practicing law in Detroit. Kirchner was an alternate delegate to Republican National Convention from Michigan in 1876. Kirchner served as Michigan Attorney General from 1877 to 1880. From 1885 to 1886, Kircher worked as a Kent Professor of Law at the University of Michigan. Kirchner worked as a Professor of Law at the University of Michigan from 1885 to 1906. Kirchner was conferred an honorary degree of Master of Arts by the University of Michigan in 1894.

Death
Kirchner died on July 21, 1920 in his home in Detroit, Michigan. He was interred in Haverhill Cemetery in Haverhill, New Hampshire next to his father.

References

1846 births
1920 deaths
Michigan Republicans
Lawyers from Detroit
Burials in New Hampshire
University of Michigan Law School faculty
Michigan Attorneys General
German emigrants to the United States
19th-century American politicians
19th-century American lawyers